Pleuroploca clava, the Persian horse conch is a species of sea snail, a marine gastropod mollusc in the family Fasciolariidae, the spindle snails, the tulip snails and their allies.

Description

Distribution
This species occurs in Sri Lanka, Indian Ocean.

References

Fasciolariidae
Gastropods described in 1846